is a 2023 action-adventure video game developed by PlatinumGames and published by Nintendo for the Nintendo Switch. A prequel to the Bayonetta series, it tells the story of the titular protagonist as a young witch named Cereza.

Gameplay
Bayonetta Origins is an action-adventure video game. Gameplay is split between the protagonist Cereza, a ten-year old witch, and Cheshire, a demon bound to her stuffed toy. Both are controlled simultaneously: Cereza is controlled using the left Joy-Con while Cheshire is controlled using the right. Cheshire can be toggled between two modes. In Unleashed mode, he grows to a large size and can attack enemies or obstacles, while in Hug mode, he shrinks to toy form so that Cereza can carry him and use him for various purposes.
 
The player must use Cereza and Cheshire in conjunction in order to fight enemies and solve various environmental puzzles. In combat, Cereza binds enemies using spells while Cheshire attacks them. Cheshire cannot die in combat, but he may run out of magic when fighting. When this occurs, Cereza will need to pick him up in Hug form to refill his magic before he can be used in battle again. Elemental Cores throughout the game world can be broken to upgrade Cheshire's abilities, making the duo more powerful in battle and allowing them to explore previously inaccessible areas.

Reception

Bayonetta Origins: Cereza and the Lost Demon received "generally favorable reviews", according to review aggregator Metacritic.

References

Notes

External links
 

2023 video games
Video game prequels
Nintendo Switch games
Nintendo Switch-only games
Action-adventure games
Video games featuring female protagonists
Bayonetta
PlatinumGames games
Single-player video games
Video games developed in Japan